Hortense was a 40-gun  and lead vessel of her class of the French Navy.

On 4 February they attacked a convoy, destroying seven ships. Three days later, they encountered another convoy escorted by the 20-gun sloop  and the 8-gun bomb vessel ; the French frigates destroyed the two Royal Navy vessels and captured and burnt  and two other merchant vessels of the convoy.

Then on 12 May 1805, Hortense and  captured the 18-gun ship-sloop . Cyane was cruising between Barbados and Martinique when she encountered a French fleet under Admiral Villeneuve. Hortense and Hermione so out-gunned Cyane that her captain, Commander George Cadogan, had no choice but to strike his colours.

Hortense took part in the Battle of Cape Finisterre, in the Battle of Trafalgar and in Lamellerie's expedition.

In 1814, she was renamed to Flore.

Citations and references

Citations

References

External links
 

Age of Sail frigates of France
Hortense-class frigates